may refer to:

 Suwa shrine, part of the Shinto shrine network headed by Suwa taisha, in Nagano Prefecture
 Suwa Shrine (Nagasaki), major Shinto shrine in Nagasaki, Japan
 Suwa Shrine (Tottori), Shinto shrine in Chizu, Tottori Prefecture, Japan